Visa requirements for Haitian citizens are administrative entry restrictions by the authorities of other states placed on citizens of Haiti. It is considered the weakest passport in The Caribbean & Latin America for traveling (along with Cuba). As of 22 of September 2020, Haitian citizens had visa-free or visa on arrival access to 49 countries and territories, ranking the Haitian passport 95th in terms of travel freedom according to the Henley Passport Index.

Visa requirements map

Visa requirements 
Visa requirements for holders of normal passports traveling for tourist purposes:

Dependent, disputed, or restricted territories
Dependent and autonomous territories

See also 

 Visa policy of Haiti
 Haitian passport

References and Notes
References

Notes

Haiti
Foreign relations of Haiti